The Waterloo Music Company was a Canadian music publishing and musical instrument retailing firm that was founded in 1921 by Charles F. Thiele in Waterloo, Ontario. During its more than eight decade history, the company published works by a large number of notable Canadian composers, including compositions by Violet Archer, John Beckwith, Keith Bissell, Jean Coulthard, Samuel Dolin, Robert Fleming, Arthur Wellesley Hughes, Talivaldis Kenins, Walter MacNutt, Stephen Michell, Barbara Pentland, Godfrey Ridout, Jeannine Vanier, Eric Wild,  and Healey Willan. In 2004 the company was acquired by St. John's Music.

References

Publishing companies established in 1921
Companies disestablished in 2004
Music retailers of Canada
Musical instrument retailers of Canada
Music publishing companies of Canada
Sheet music publishing companies
Defunct music companies